Camassia quamash,  commonly known as camas, small camas, common camas, common camash or quamash, is a perennial herb. It is native to western North America in large areas of southern Canada and the northwestern United States.

Description
It is a perennial herbaceous monocot with grasslike leaves emerging from a persistent bulb in a basal rosette.

The pale blue to deep blue flowers appear in late spring to early summer (May to June in their native habitat). They are arranged in a raceme at the end of the stem.

The plant and its bulbs are similar to the toxic white-flowered meadow death-camas (which is not in Camassia, but part of the genus Toxicoscordion, which grows in the same areas).

Taxonomy

There are eight subspecies;
Camassia quamash subsp. azurea – small camas
Camassia quamash subsp. breviflora – small camas
Camassia quamash subsp. intermedia – small camas
Camassia quamash subsp. linearis – small camas
Camassia quamash subsp. maxima – small camas
Camassia quamash subsp. quamash – common camas
Camassia quamash subsp. utahensis – Utah small camas
Camassia quamash subsp. walpolei – Walpole's small camas

Synonyms 
The superseded name for Camassia quamash subsp. quamash, Camassia esculenta (Nutt.) Lindl., should not be confused with the superseded name Camassia esculenta (Ker Gawl.) B.L.Rob., (nom. illeg.) for Camassia scilloides.

Etymology
The genus name comes from the Nez Perce Indian name for this plant, and means "sweet". Qém'es, a term for the plant's bulb, which was gathered and used as a food source by tribes in the Pacific Northwest, and were an important food source for the Lewis and Clark Expedition (1804–1806). The bulbs are or were harvested and pit-roasted or boiled by women of the Nez Perce, Cree, and Blackfoot tribes.

Distribution and habitat 

The species is native to western North America in large areas of southern Canada and the northwestern United States, from British Columbia and Alberta to California and east from Washington state to Montana and Wyoming.

Though the once-immense spreads of camas lands have diminished because of modern developments and agriculture, numerous camas prairies and marshes may still be seen today. In the Great Basin, expanded settlement by whites accompanied by turning cattle and hogs onto camas prairies greatly diminished food available to native tribes and increased tension between Native Americans and settlers and travelers. Both the Bannock and Nez Perce Wars began after Nez Perce became incensed at the failure of the US government to uphold treaties, and at settlers who plowed up their camas prairies, which they depended on for subsistence.

Cultivation
This bulbflower naturalizes well in gardens. The bulb grows best in well-drained soil high in humus. It will grow in lightly shaded forest areas and on rocky outcrops as well as in open meadows or prairies. Additionally it is found growing alongside streams and rivers. The plants may be divided in autumn after the leaves have withered. Additionally the plant spreads by seed rather than by runners.

Uses
Camas is grown as an ornamental plant. Even in the wild, large numbers of camas can color an entire meadow blue-violet.

Food
The bulbs of Camassia species are edible and nutritious when roasted or boiled, but should not be confused with the toxic white-flowered meadow death-camas; the bulbs are difficult to distinguish.

Camas has been a food source for many native peoples in the western United States and Canada. After being harvested in the autumn, once the flowers have withered, the bulbs are pit-roasted or boiled. The latter produced a syrup. A pit-cooked camas bulb looks and tastes something like baked sweet potato, but sweeter, and with more crystalline fibers due to the presence of inulin in the bulbs—an oligosaccharide responsible for the copious flatulence caused by excessive consumption or consumption of undercooked bulbs. Bulbs can also be dried and pounded into flour, which can be used for baking or as a thickener. Native American tribes who ate camas include the Nez Perce, Cree, Coast Salish, Lummi, and Blackfoot tribes, among many others. Camas bulbs contributed to the survival of members of the Lewis and Clark Expedition (1804–06).

Camas bulbs (and bannock made from them) are listed in the Ark of Taste.

References

External links

Flora of North America: Camassia quamash
Plants For A Future: Camassia quamash
Michigan State University Extension: Camassia quamash

Agavoideae
Plants used in Native American cuisine
Root vegetables
Garden plants
Flora of Alberta
Flora of British Columbia
Flora of Idaho
Flora of Montana
Flora of Oregon
Flora of Washington (state)
Flora of Wyoming
Flora of California
Flora of Nevada
Flora of Utah
Flora of the Sierra Nevada (United States)
Cuisine of the Western United States
Garden plants of North America
Canadian cuisine
Crops originating from indigenous Americans
Flora without expected TNC conservation status